Hampstead, in the London Borough of Camden, England, is home to a number of schools, of various types.

State-funded primary schools
 Christ Church Primary School (Mixed, Voluntary Aided)
 Fitzjohn's Primary School (Mixed, Community)
 Fleet Primary School (Mixed, Community)
 Hampstead Parochial Primary School (Mixed, Voluntary Aided, Church of England)
 Holy Trinity Primary School (Church of England)
 New End Primary School (Mixed, Community)
 The Rosary RC Primary School (Mixed, Voluntary Aided)
 Saint Pauls Primary School (Church of England)

State-funded secondary schools
 Hampstead School (Mixed, Community) 
 Haverstock School (Mixed, Community)
 Parliament Hill School (Girls, Community)
 William Ellis School (Boys, Voluntary Aided)

Special schools
 Royal Free Hospital Children's School (Mixed, Special Community)

Independent schools

Primary and preparatory schools
 Devonshire House Preparatory School (Mixed)
 Hall School (Boys)
 Hampstead Hill School (Mixed)
 Heathside Preparatory School (Mixed)
 Hereward House School (Boys)
 Kerem School (Mixed, Jewish)
 Lyndhurst House Preparatory School (Boys)
 Maria Montessori School (Mixed)
 North Bridge House School (Mixed)
 The nursery and primary schools and one campus of the senior school are in Hampstead
 Phoenix School (Mixed)
 South Hampstead Junior School (Girls)
 Southbank International School (Mixed)
 St Anthony's Preparatory School (Boys, Catholic)
 St Anthony's School for Girls (Girls, Catholic)
 St Christopher's School (Girls)
 St Margaret's School (Girls)
 St Mary's School (Mixed)
 The Academy School (Mixed)
 The Village School (Girls)
 University College School (Junior Branch) (Boys)

Secondary and senior schools
 South Hampstead High School (Girls)
 King Alfred School (Mixed)
 North Bridge House School (Mixed)
 St Margaret's School (Girls)
 University College School (Boys)

Colleges
 ESCP Europe
 British College of Osteopathic Medicine
 Hampstead College Of Fine Arts & Humanities
 Hampstead Cuisine School
 Hampstead School of Art
 Hampstead School of English
 Hampstead School of Speech & Drama
 King's College London
 Lakefield Hospitality College
 UCL Medical School

References

 
Hampstead